Prestegårdskogen is a village area located in the municipality of Grimstad in Agder county, Norway. The village is entirely made up of houses, with people working in the nearby town of Grimstad,  to the east.

History
The area was originally the farm estate of the priest of Landvik (also known as the Hommedal prestegjeld). The farm was passed from priest to priest starting in 1684. This is where the priest and his family lived and farmed for centuries. The farm and houses still are in use, but fairly recently, the neighborhood called Prestegårdskogen was built in the forested areas in the eastern half of the historic estate.

References

Villages in Agder
Grimstad